Jan Paulsson is a Swedish scholar and practitioner in the area of international arbitration.

Early life
Paulsson received his A.B. from Harvard University in 1971, his J.D. from Yale Law School in 1975, where he was an editor of the Yale Law Journal, and a Diplôme d’etudes supérieurs spécialisées from the University of Paris in 1977.

Career
Paulsson was co-head of the international arbitration and public international law groups of Freshfields Bruckhaus Deringer LLP, and helped found Three Crowns LLP, a boutique international arbitration firm.  In December 2020, Three Crowns announced his retirement from the firm.

Paulsson is the Chair of the International Arbitration LL.M. program at the University of Miami School of Law and a holder of the Michael Klein Distinguished Scholar Chair.

Since 2011, he also has served as a judge of the International Monetary Fund's Administrative Tribunal.

References

External links
A State’s Power to Make Meaningful Promises to Foreigners in the Lecture Series of the United Nations Audiovisual Library of International Law

Living people
Year of birth missing (living people)
Harvard University alumni
Yale Law School alumni
University of Paris alumni
20th-century Swedish lawyers
Swedish scholars and academics
International Monetary Fund people
Swedish officials of the United Nations
University of Miami faculty
21st-century Swedish judges